Richard Swift may refer to:
 Richard Swift (composer) (1927–2003), American composer and music theorist
 Richard Swift (politician) (1811–1872), member of the UK Parliament for Sligo County
 Richard Swift (musician) (1977–2018), American singer-songwriter
 Richard Swift, 17th-century Ambassador of the Kingdom of England to Russia
 Shade (comics) or Richard Swift, a DC Comics villain